VSOE may refer to:
 Venice-Simplon Orient Express
 Vendor-specific objective evidence (accounting/contracting)